Rossosh is a rural locality (a selo) and the administrative center of Rossoshanskoye Rural Settlement, Repyovsky District, Voronezh Oblast, Russia. The population was 858 as of 2010. There are 10 streets.

Geography 
Rossosh is located 21 km northwest of Repyovka (the district's administrative centre) by road. Zarosly is the nearest rural locality.

References 

Rural localities in Repyovsky District